Patrick Mark Cooney (born 2 March 1931) is a former Irish Fine Gael politician who served as a government minister in the cabinets of Liam Cosgrave (1973–1977) and Garret FitzGerald (1981–1982 and 1982–1987). He served as a Member of the European Parliament (MEP) for the Leinster constituency from 1989 to 1994. He served as a Teachta Dála (TD) for the Longford–Westmeath constituency from 1970 to 1977 and between 1981 and 1989. He also served as a Senator for the Cultural and Educational Panel from 1977 to 1981.

Cooney was born in 1931 and was educated at Castleknock College and University College Dublin, where he completed a BA in 1951 and an LLB (Bachelor of Laws) in 1953. He first stood as a candidate for Dáil Éireann in the Longford–Westmeath constituency at the 1961 general election, but failed to win a seat, and he was defeated again in 1965 and 1969. However, after the death of the Fianna Fáil TD Patrick Lenihan, Cooney was elected to the 19th Dáil in the Longford–Westmeath by-election in April 1970.

After the 1973 general election, a Fine Gael–Labour Party National Coalition government to office, and Cooney was appointed to Liam Cosgrave's cabinet as Minister for Justice. He ordered the coffin of Frank Stagg, an IRA volunteer, to be covered in concrete. In December 1973, the Supreme Court found in McGee v. The Attorney General that marital privacy was protected by the Constitution of Ireland, including a right to contraception. Cooney proposed the Control of Importation, Sale and Manufacture of Contraceptives Bill 1974, which was defeated in the Dáil on a free vote, with Cosgrave voting against the legislation proposed by a member of his cabinet.

Cooney was one of a number of cabinet ministers to lose his seat at the 1977 general election, but was subsequently elected to the 14th Seanad as a Senator for the Cultural and Educational Panel. In 1979, at the first direct elections to the European Parliament, he stood unsuccessfully in the Connacht–Ulster constituency.

At the 1981 general election, he was returned to the Dáil again for his old Longford–Westmeath constituency. Under Garret FitzGerald, Cooney served as Minister for Transport and Minister for Posts and Telegraphs from June 1981 to March 1982, as Minister for Defence from December 1982 to February 1986, and as Minister for Education from 1986 to 1987.

He was elected as a MEP for the Leinster constituency at the 1989 European Parliament elections, and did not contest the 1989 general election. He did not stand for re-election in 1994.

References

External links

1931 births
Living people
Fine Gael TDs
Members of the 19th Dáil
Members of the 20th Dáil
Members of the 14th Seanad
Members of the 22nd Dáil
Members of the 23rd Dáil
Members of the 24th Dáil
Members of the 25th Dáil
Fine Gael MEPs
MEPs for the Republic of Ireland 1989–1994
People educated at Castleknock College
Ministers for Justice (Ireland)
Ministers for Defence (Ireland)
Ministers for Education (Ireland)
Ministers for Transport (Ireland)
Alumni of University College Dublin
Fine Gael senators